Sébastien Amiez (born 6 May 1972) is a French former alpine skier. He won the Alpine Skiing World Cup for Slalom in 1996

World Cup victories

References

External links
 

1972 births
Living people
French male alpine skiers
Olympic alpine skiers of France
Olympic silver medalists for France
Alpine skiers at the 1994 Winter Olympics
Alpine skiers at the 1998 Winter Olympics
Alpine skiers at the 2002 Winter Olympics
Olympic medalists in alpine skiing
FIS Alpine Ski World Cup champions
Medalists at the 2002 Winter Olympics